Peitz is a town in Brandenburg, Germany.

Peitz may also refer to:

People
 Anne-Kathrin Peitz (born 1972), German film director and producer
 Dominic Peitz (born 1984), German footballer
 Heinie Peitz (1870–1943), American baseballer
 Joe Peitz (1869–1919), American baseballer

Other uses
 Peitz 101, French aircraft